Al Maqatirah District is a district of the Lahij Governorate, Yemen. As of 2003, the district had a population of 54,613 inhabitants.

References

Districts of Lahij Governorate